Nickey Reed Browning (born July 19, 1951) is a former Republican member of the Mississippi Senate, having represented the 3rd District in northeastern Mississippi from 1996 to 2020.

Early life and education 
Browning was born on July 19, 1951 in Ponotoc, Mississippi. He attended Northeast Mississippi Community College and graduated from Mississippi State University.

Political career 
On March 27, 2013, Browning switched from the Democratic Party to the Republican Party. He did not file for re-election in 2020.

Personal life 
Browning is a member of the Lions Club. He is a Methodist.

He resides in Ecru in Pontotoc County, near Tupelo, Mississippi.

See also

 List of American politicians who switched parties in office

References

External links
Project Vote Smart - Senator Nickey R. Browning (MS) profile
Follow the Money - Campaign contributions from 1999 to 2015

1951 births
Living people
People from Pontotoc, Mississippi
Businesspeople from Mississippi
Mississippi Democrats
Mississippi state senators
Mississippi Republicans
21st-century American politicians
American United Methodists